Askia Rahman Jones (born December 3, 1971) is an American-Venezuelan former professional basketball player. A 6'5" (1.96 m) shooting guard, Jones was not drafted by a National Basketball Association team, but did play in eleven games for the Minnesota Timberwolves, averaging 4.1 points a game and held a prominent career playing basketball in nine different countries. 

Today, the former player lives with his Fiancé Emma Gonzalez, a Florida native who is of Cuban - Puerto descent and a healthcare executive for a large healthcare system.

Basketball career
A Kansas State University graduate born in Philadelphia, Pennsylvania, Jones left college as the third-leading scorer in its history. He finished his four-year college career averaging 14.8 points a game. 

His scoring prowess was demonstrated on March 24, 1994, when he scored sixty-two points in only twenty-eight minutes against Fresno State in the 1994 NIT quarterfinals, the second-highest postseason scoring total in college basketball history.  The fourteen three-point field goals scored by Jones in that game are a postseason record. 

He is also the last Division I men's player to date to have a sixty-point regulation game; the only other players since then to score sixty points, Eddie House in 2000 and Ben Woodside in 2008, respectively required two and three overtimes.

The son of former National Basketball Association player Wali Jones, Jones, after brief spell with the Minnesota Timberwolves in 1994–95, took his game to Venezuela, Brazil, Indonesia, the Philippines, Portugal, Cyprus and Spain, in a professional career spanning almost two decades.

He eventually received Venezuelan citizenship and played with Venezuela national basketball team in the 2005 FIBA Americas Championship, winning the bronze medal.

See also
 List of NCAA Division I men's basketball players with 12 or more 3-point field goals in a game
 List of NCAA Division I men's basketball players with 60 or more points in a game

References

External links
Basketpedya career data
NBA stats @ basketballreference.com

1971 births
Living people
African-American basketball players
American expatriate basketball people in Brazil
American expatriate basketball people in Cyprus
American expatriate basketball people in the Philippines
American expatriate basketball people in Portugal
American expatriate basketball people in Spain
American expatriate basketball people in Venezuela
American men's basketball players
Basketball players from Philadelphia
Flamengo basketball players
Gaiteros del Zulia players
Guaiqueríes de Margarita players
Joventut Badalona players
Kansas State Wildcats men's basketball players
Liga ACB players
Minnesota Timberwolves players
Rockford Lightning players
Shooting guards
Trotamundos B.B.C. players
Undrafted National Basketball Association players
Shell Turbo Chargers players
21st-century African-American sportspeople
20th-century African-American sportspeople